For the results of the Comoros national football team, see:

 Comoros national football team results (1979–2019)
 Comoros national football team results (2020–present)